Carl Viktor Andersson Frisk (born 2 March 1995) is a Swedish fashion blogger and singer. Along with Samir Badran, he is part of the musical duo Samir & Viktor.

Career
In May 2014, the duo released their first music single called "Success". The song peaked at number one during its first week on the Swedish iTunes chart.

Samir & Viktor took part in Melodifestivalen 2015 with the song "Groupie" in a bid to represent Sweden in the Eurovision Song Contest 2015 in Vienna, Austria. They took part in Melodifestivalen 2016 as well with the song "Bada nakna". They also took part in Melodifestivalen 2018 with the song "Shuffla". He participated in Let's Dance 2018 broadcast on TV4 and finished in 5th place.

In 2017, Frisk published his first book Min Superkraft (My Superpower), which deals with his personal experiences living with a ADHD diagnosis. In 2018, Frisk published his second book Samir & Viktor, this time along with Badran. The same year Frisk made a art print about ADHD with designer David Thornell

Personal life
On 28 August 2016, he came out as bisexual via his Instagram account. In April 2022, he became engaged to his partner Andreas Gran.

Discography

Singles
as Samir & Viktor
2014: "Success"
2015: "Groupie
2015: "Saxofuckingfon"
2016: "Bada nakna"
2016: "Fick Feeling"
2017: "Kung"
2017: "Vi gör det ändå"
2017: "Rakt in i kaklet"
2018: "Shuffla"
2018: "Put Your Hands Up för Sverige"

as Himself
2017: "Allting ordnar sig"

Bibliography
2017 – Min Superkraft 
2018 – Samir & Victor

References

External links 

Official website

1995 births
Living people
Swedish bloggers
Swedish LGBT singers
Bisexual men
Bisexual singers
Male bloggers
21st-century Swedish male singers
20th-century Swedish LGBT people
21st-century Swedish LGBT people
Melodifestivalen contestants of 2018
Melodifestivalen contestants of 2016
Melodifestivalen contestants of 2015